Sir Alured Dumbell MLC (12 January 1835 – 12 March 1900) was a senior judge who was Clerk of the Rolls of the Isle of Man.

Dumbell was born in Douglas, the son of the well-known banker, lawyer and politician George Dumbell MHK and Mary Gibson, and was educated at a private school in Douglas. He then entered the firm of Harris and Adams as a law student.  He was admitted to the bar in 1858 and soon acquired a large practice in the north of the island. He became High Bailiff of Ramsey in 1873 then Second Deemster in 1880, and finally Clerk of the Rolls in 1883. 

He was knighted in the 1899 Birthday Honours list, and later the same year acted as Deputy Governor of the Isle of Man during the prolonged absence through illness of the Lieutenant-Governor Lord Henniker. 

Dumbell died of paralysis in the brain on 12 March 1900.

Family
Dumbell married, in 1875, Mary Rolston, daughter of Major Rolston, of the Indian Army.

Offices of State

High Bailiff of Ramsey, 1873–1880
Second Deemster, 1880–1883
Clerk of the Rolls, 1883–1900

References

1835 births
1900 deaths
Knights Bachelor
Lieutenant Governors of the Isle of Man
Manx judges